The signal barb (Labiobarbus festivus) is a species of ray-finned fish in the genus Labiobarbus found in the southern Malay peninsula.

References

festivus
Taxa named by Johann Jakob Heckel
Fish described in 1843